Rzuchow may refer to the following places:
Rzuchów, Greater Poland Voivodeship (west-central Poland)
Rzuchów, Silesian Voivodeship (south Poland)
Rzuchów, Subcarpathian Voivodeship (south-east Poland)
Rzuchów, Świętokrzyskie Voivodeship(south-central Poland)